Alexandreio Melathron Nick Galis Hall (Greek: Αλεξάνδρειο Μέλαθρον, Σάλα Νίκος Γκάλης) is an indoor sports arena that is located in Thessaloniki, Greece. It is also often referred to as the Palais des Sports (Greek: Παλαί ντε Σπορ).

The arena is mainly used to host basketball and volleyball games. The arena's main hall, called Nikos Galis Hall, has a permanent seating capacity of 5,138, and a capacity of 6,000 with temporary seating, for basketball games. The arena also contains a practice court, club offices, shops, and a museum dedicated to the Aris basketball club. The arena hosts the home games of Aris Thessaloniki B.C., a member of the Greek League.

Location
The Alexandreio Melathron Nikos Galis Hall indoor arena is located in downtown Thessaloniki, inside the International trade fare grounds. Bus lines #2, #7, #8, #10, #14, #27, #31, and #58, running along Egnatia Avenue, stop right in front of the arena. Ιn 2020, the new metro station, "Panepistimio", which is located near to the arena, will open.

Construction
The arena was designed by the architects P. Gianettos, M. Guyon and T. Jeanblock between 1960 and 1962. It was built in 1966. The structure shares two of the architects with the Palais des Sports de Gerland in Lyon and has many similarities.

The building was redeveloped and updated in 2004, in preparation for the Athens 2004 Olympic Games. The updates involved reconstruction of all the building's external and internal areas. Apart from what is directly visible to everybody, other works included new electrical and mechanical updates, air-conditioning, and audiovisual facilities. New seats, CCTV, and new lighting were also installed.

These updates unfortunately resulted in a lower permanent seating capacity (5,138 compared to the previous 6,000) for Alexandreio Arena, which reopened its gates in late 2004. The arena was again updated in 2015.

History
The arena was named after Alexander the Great, the king (basileus) of ancient greek kingdom of Macedonia. It is also commonly referred to as the "Palais des Sports" (meaning "Sports Palace", in French). Under its former names, the arena was the first large indoor basketball arena built in Greece, and remained the largest until the year 1985, when the Peace and Friendship Stadium in Athens, was completed and opened to the public.

Being part of the Thessaloniki International Fair, the arena also serves for many purposes other than sports. It has hosted many international basketball events, and was also the home arena for both "arch-rivals", Aris B.C. and PAOK B.C. for many years; up until the year 2000, when PAOK B.C. moved into their own new stadium, the P.A.O.K. Sports Arena.

On May 8, 2013, at an event honoring the well-known retired former Aris player, Nikos Galis, the Greek deputy culture minister, Giannis Ioannidis, announced that the main hall of the arena was to be renamed to "Nikos Galis Hall".

Ownership
The arena is owned and operated by the Greek Ministry of Culture's General Secretariat of Sports.

Gallery

See also
 List of indoor arenas in Greece

References

External links

Official site, now obsolete - Archived on 2011/12/19
Alexandrio Melathron @ Stadia.gr

Aris Thessaloniki
Aris B.C.
Basketball venues in Greece
Buildings and structures completed in 1966
Indoor arenas in Greece
Modernist architecture in Greece
Sports venues in Thessaloniki
Volleyball venues in Greece
1966 establishments in Greece